Carbohydrate sulfotransferase 15 is an enzyme that in humans is encoded by the CHST15 gene. It belongs to the N-acetylgalactosamine 4-sulfate 6-O-sulfotransferase enzyme class.

References

Further reading